The 104th Infantry Division was an infantry division of the United States Army. Today, it is known as the 104th Training Division (Leader Training) and based at Fort Lewis, Washington, as a training unit of the United States Army Reserve.

Activated in 1921 and deployed during World War II, the division saw almost 200 days of fighting in northwestern Europe as it fought through France, Netherlands, Belgium, and western Germany, fighting back several fierce German counterattacks as it advanced through the theater throughout late 1944 and 1945. This was the only combat duty that the 104th Infantry Division has served during its history. At the end of the fighting on 7 May 1945 (V-E Day), this division was in central Germany opposite the troops of its allies from the Soviet Army.

After World War II, this division was reorganized primarily as a training division for Reserve forces. After several decades, the division then expanded its role to conducting entry-level training for soldiers of all branches of the Army in the northwestern United States. Its role and size have expanded over that time due to the consolidation of other training commands, and the division subsequently took charge of a number of brigades specializing in various entry-level training for soldiers of all types.

History

Interwar period

The 104th Infantry Division was first constituted on 24 June 1921 as the 104th Division, before being organized and activated in October of that year in Salt Lake City, Utah. Assigned to the division were the 207th and 208th Infantry Brigades, containing the 413th, 414th, 415th, and 416th Infantry Regiments. As a unit of the Organized Reserves, the division's subordinate units were spread among the states of Idaho, Montana, Nevada, Utah, and Wyoming. In 1924 it received its shoulder sleeve insignia. Populated mostly with officers through the Reserve Officers Training Corps from colleges and universities in its allotted states, the division remained basically an officer cadre with few enlisted men, and would not see significant duty until World War II.

World War II
At the outbreak of World War II, the 104th Infantry Division began preparing to participate in the war in Europe. The division was ordered into active military service on 15 September 1942 under the command of Major General Gilbert R. Cook, and was reorganized as the 104th Infantry Division at Camp Adair, Oregon. The 207th and 208th Infantry Brigades did not reactivate as part of an army-wide elimination of brigade commands within its divisions. The division was instead centered on three infantry regiments; the 413th, the 414th, and 415th Infantry Regiments.

Order of battle

 Headquarters, 104th Infantry Division
 413th Infantry Regiment
 414th Infantry Regiment
 415th Infantry Regiment
 Headquarters and Headquarters Battery, 104th Infantry Division Artillery
 385th Field Artillery Battalion (105 mm)
 386th Field Artillery Battalion (105 mm)
 387th Field Artillery Battalion (155 mm)
 929th Field Artillery Battalion (105 mm)
 329th Engineer Combat Battalion
 329th Medical Battalion
 104th Counter Intelligence Corps Det
 104th Cavalry Reconnaissance Troop (Mechanized)
 Headquarters, Special Troops, 104th Infantry Division
 Headquarters Company, 104th Infantry Division
 804th Ordnance Light Maintenance Company
 104th Quartermaster Company
 104th Signal Company
 Military Police Platoon
 Band
 104th Counterintelligence Corps Detachment
 750th Tank Battalion (attached 16 NOV 44-23 DEC 44, 6 FEB 45-22 MAY 45)
 784th Tank Battalion (attached 31 DEC 44-3 FEB 45)
 692nd Tank Destroyer Battalion (attached 29 OCT 44-7 MAR 45)
 817th Tank Destroyer Battalion (attached 1 APR 45-9 JUN 45)
 555th Anti-Aircraft Artillery Automatic Weapons Battalion (attached 26 OCT 44-24 MAY 45)

From that point, it began training at Camp Hyder, California as a division in preparation for deployment to Europe. The division trained in the northwestern United States during the next two years, earning its name "Timberwolf Division" from its time in the area. The division was the first U.S. Army division to be trained to fight in nighttime conditions. After training at Camp Adair, the division participation in the Oregon Maneuver combat exercise in the fall of 1943. On 15 October 1943, Major General Terry de la Mesa Allen Sr. took command of the division. He had previously commanded the 1st Infantry Division, "The Big Red One", in North Africa and Sicily and would command the 104th during most of its time in combat.

Europe

The 104th Infantry Division sailed for the Western Front on 27 August 1944. It landed in France on 7 September 1944. The division was assigned to III Corps of the Ninth United States Army, part of the Twelfth United States Army Group. The division then organized and assembled at Manche, France before heading into combat.

Joining the Battle of the Scheldt, the division moved into defensive positions in the vicinity of Wuustwezel, Belgium on 23 October 1944. The Timberwolves were then assigned to Field Marshal Sir Bernard Montgomery's Anglo-Canadian 21st Army Group under the British I Corps, within the First Canadian Army, along with the U.S. 7th Armored Division, in order to clear out the Scheldt Estuary and open the port of Antwerp. While the U.S. 7th Armored Division was assigned static duty holding the right flank of the gains made during the failed Market Garden operation, the 104th Infantry Division was to participate in the First Canadian Army's taking of the Scheldt. The Timberwolves travelled across France by train and debarked near the Belgian-Dutch border and waited for word to take part in a new allied offensive, Operation Pheasant, taking the place of the experienced British 49th Infantry Division on the left flank and the Polish 1st Armored Division on the right.

The Americans were given responsibility for taking 22 miles of wet, low country from the Belgian border to the Meuse (Maas). The width of their front was approximately 8,000 yards. General Allen planned to employ all three of his regiments at the same time, shoulder to shoulder. The 104th began combat operations on 25 and 26 October and began to attack the Germans, who offered varying levels of resistance. Along the division's front, the Germans were spread thinly and did not have continuous lines of defense. However, they did possess deadly strong points and endeavored to make the Timberwolves' progress as time-consuming and costly as possible, making heavy use of mines, booby traps, and roadblocks. Despite this, the advance was steady, though paid for in the lives of the 104th Division soldiers. Conditions were rainy, chilly, wet, and muddy. Moisture seemed to grip everything and everyone. Sleet beat down on the troops, who went for days soaked to the skin and slimy with mud. On 30 October, after five days of continuous operations the division had pushed about 15 miles to within sight of the Mark River and had liberated Zundert, gained control of the Breda-Roosendaal Road, and overrun the Vaart Canal defenses. Leur and Etten fell as the division advanced to the Mark River, arriving there by 31 October. A coordinated attack over the Mark River at Standdaarbuiten on 2 November established a bridgehead and the rest of the division crossed the river. With the Allies firmly on the north side of the Mark River, German resistance collapsed. For the next two days, the Timberwolves pursued enemy remnants north to the Meuse. Zevenbergen was captured and the Meuse was reached on 5 November. That same day, General Allen received orders from the U.S. First Army, releasing it from Canadian control. While the bulk of the division moved near Aachen, Germany, elements remained to secure Moerdijk until 7 November, when they were relieved. During this time, the division was reassigned to VII Corps of the U.S. 1st Army, also part of the Twelfth Army Group. By 7 November, the fighting in the Netherlands cost the Timberwolves 1,426 casualties, including 313 killed and 103 missing. Montgomery and the Canadian commanders sent their congratulations, and General Allen disseminated copies of their letters to his regiments and wrote a personal letter of thanks to everyone in the division, concluding with his favorite motto, "Nothing in Hell must stop the Timberwolves!" As a result of the actions of the 104th and their Allied counterparts, the Scheldt Estuary was cleared. The Royal Navy took three weeks to sweep the estuary waters clear of mines, and in early December 1944, the port of Antwerp was open to Allied shipping.

While under American command on 16 November 1944, the division went on another offensive in support of Operation Queen, taking Stolberg and pushing on against heavy resistance. Eschweiler fell on 21 November and the enemy was cleared from the area west of the Inde River, including Inden by 2 December 1944. Lucherberg was held against enemy counterattacks on 3 December, and all strongholds west of the Roer River were captured by the 23rd. It took temporary command of the 60th Infantry Regiment of the 9th Infantry Division. During the Battle of the Bulge, the 104th actively defended its sector near Duren and Merken (in German only) from 15 December 1944 to 22 February 1945. During that time, it was reassigned to XIX Corps of the Ninth United States Army. It then moved across the Roer taking Huchem-Stammeln, Birkesdorf, and North Duren. On 5 March, after heavy fighting, it entered Köln. After defending the west bank of the Rhine River, the division crossed the river at Honnef on 22 March 1945, and attacked to the east of the Remagen bridgehead. During this time, some of the division's assets fell under command of the 1st Infantry Division and the 3rd Armored Division. After a period of mopping up and consolidation, it participated in the trap of enemy troops in the Ruhr pocket. The 104th repulsed heavy attacks near Medebach and captured Paderborn on 1 April 1945. After regrouping, it advanced to the east and crossed the Weser River on 8 April, blocking enemy exits from the Harz Mountains. On 11 April 1945 the Division was involved in the liberation of a large German concentration camp at Nordhausen. The division then crossed the Saale River and took Halle in a bitter five-day struggle from 15 to 19 April. The sector to the Mulde River was cleared by 21 April, and after vigorous patrolling, contacted the Red Army at Pretzsch on 26 April. The division took temporary command of assets from the 69th Infantry Division in early May.

Casualties

Total battle casualties: 4,961
Killed in action: 971
Wounded in action: 3,657
Missing in action: 96
Prisoner of war: 237

Demobilization
The division returned to the United States on 3 July 1945. Upon return, it continued the process of demobilization until 20 December of that year, when it was inactivated.

During World War II, soldiers of the division were awarded two Medals of Honor, 14 Distinguished Service Crosses, one Distinguished Service Medal, 642 Silver Star Medals, six Legion of Merit medals, 20 Soldier's Medals, 2,797 Bronze Star Medals, and 40 Air Medals. The division received 9 Distinguished Unit Citations and three campaign streamers during 200 days of combat.

Training Division
The division was reactivated on 1 December 1946 in the organized reserves in Portland, Oregon. It began taking on the responsibility of holding training programs for new soldiers of the US Army Reserve. In July 1948, the division held its first session of summer training. By the end of the training, it had turned out 300 new reservists. By 1952, the division was turning out 1,500 new reservists per training camp. The division was reorganized specifically as a training division in 1959. In 1961, the division was relocated to Vancouver Barracks, Washington.

In 1967, the division was reorganized. As part of an army-wide initiative known as the Reorganization Objective Army Division plan, the division's regiments were disbanded and replaced with larger and more versatile brigades. The 1st Brigade, 104th Division, activated at Vancouver Barracks, and the 2nd Brigade, 104th Division activated at Pasco, Washington. Meanwhile, the 3rd Brigade, 104th Division, as well as the 4th Brigade, 104th Division both activated at Fort Lawton, Washington. Each of these brigades carried the history of other historic units which fought under the 104th Infantry Division in World War II. The 104th Division was then assigned the mission of conducting One Station Unit Training, Basic Combat Training, Advanced Individual Training, and Combat Support training. 1st Brigade took on basic combat training, while 3rd Brigade undertook combat support training, 4th Brigade conducted combat service support training.

In 1996, three more brigades were added to the division's structure. The 5th Brigade, 104th Division was activated at Salt Lake City, Utah. The 6th Brigade, 104th Division was activated at Aurora, Colorado. The 7th Brigade, 104th Division activated at Vancouver, Washington. The 5th Brigade conducted health services training, 6th Brigade took charge of professional development training and 7th Brigade provided training support to the other brigades. These units were redesignated from other training commands and put under the command of the division.

Two additional provisional brigades were created under the 104th Division in 1999; the 8th Brigade, 104th Division was created at Fort Lewis as a unit for training Reserve Officers' Training Corps cadets, and the 4690th US Army Reserve Forces School at Fort Shafter, Hawaii was redesignated as the 4690th Brigade, 104th Division, for service as a multifunctional training unit. In 2005, the Base Realignment and Closure suggestions included the closure of the Vancouver Barracks, and the 104th Division was subsequently relocated to Fort Lewis, Washington. In 2005, the current Distinctive Unit Insignia was designed under the direction of Major General Terrill K. (TK) Moffett. The 104th received its new distinctive unit insignia in 2006.

In October 2007, the division was renamed the 104th Training Division (Leader Training). This change reflected a change in the division's mission, specifically training officer and non-commissioned officer candidates in their assigned fields.

Subordinate units 

As of 2017 the following units are subordinated to the 104th Training Division (Leader Training):

 1st Brigade (Leader Training)
 2nd Battalion, 319th Regiment (Cadet Summer Training)
 4th Battalion, 399th Regiment (Cadet Summer Training)
 4th Battalion, 413th Regiment (Senior Reserve Officer Training Course)
 3rd Battalion, 414th Regiment (Cadet Summer Training)
 4th Battalion, 414th Regiment (Senior Reserve Officer Training Course)
 2nd Brigade (Leader Training)
 1st Battalion, 398th Regiment (Drill Sergeants)
 2nd Battalion, 317th Regiment (Drill Sergeants)
 2nd Battalion, 397th Regiment (Drill Sergeants)
 3rd Battalion, 304th Regiment (United States Military Academy)

Honors

Unit decorations

Campaign streamers

Legacy

Several people who served with the 104th Infantry Division later went on to achieve notability for various reasons. Among these people are Rabbi Gunther Plaut, paleontologist Charles Repenning, Governor of Iowa Leo Hoegh, New York City mayor Ed Koch, New York governor Hugh L. Carey, judge Perry Shields, and generals John R. Deane Jr. and Bryant Moore. In addition, actor James G. Snitzer was a member of the 104th and died in combat in 1945. NFL Player Bob Shaw also served with the 104th and was awarded the Bronze Star during World War II. Screenwriter Paddy Chayefsky also served with the 104th during WW2.

In addition, two soldiers from this division were awarded the Medal of Honor for their service in combat. They are Willy F. James Jr., for scouting German positions while being pinned down by machine gun fire, and Cecil H. Bolton, who led a company of men on the attack despite wounds from a mortar shell. Bernard Moore was a member of the 104th Timberwolves and went on to be the manager at the Waldorf Astoria Towers in New York, later promoted to the Washington Hilton in Washington, DC.

Notable former members
James Marshall Sprouse, World War II

Edward Koch, World War II

Willy F. James Jr., World War II

References

Sources

External links
 104th Infantry Division Association
 104th Infantry Division Command Personnel
 Lineage  at the United States Army Center of Military History
 Timberwolves: The Story of the 104th Infantry Division
 Liberation of Achtmaal by the 415th Regiment of the 104th Inf.Div. 
 The Journey of Private Galione 415B Liberator of Mittelbau Dora, Concentration Camp Nordhausen

104th Infantry Division, U.S.
Infantry Division, U.S. 104th
Military units and formations established in 1921
1921 establishments in Utah
Infantry divisions of the United States Army in World War II
Training divisions of the United States Army